Louise Donoghue is a camogie player, from the Kiltale club in Meath. She is the winner of a Camogie All Stars Awards#Soaring StarsSoaring Star award in 2009.

References

Living people
Meath camogie players
Year of birth missing (living people)